Uran Butka (2 December 1938) is an Albanian writer, historian and politician. The son of Safet Butka and grandson of Sali Butka, he is one of the founding members of the National Association of Political Prisoners. Butka also served as a member of the Albanian Parliament from 1992 to 1997.

Life 
After completing his pedagogical studies, Butka worked for 16 years as a teacher of linguistics and literature in the districts of Fier, Krujë and Tiranë. Due to his family biography he was laid off from his job as a teacher and later worked as a painter at a shoe factory in Tirana. In 1976, along with his family, he was interned to Tropojë then later to Martanesh where he lived for 11 years in isolation, changing his profession and working as an accountant at the local village cooperative.
On the eve of the Fall of communism in Albania, Butka returned to Tirana where he served for several years in various communal jobs as a painter, decorator and designer. In 1991, along with Kurt Kola and others he co-founded the National Association of Political Prisoners. Butka also served as editor-in-chief of newspaper "Liria" for a number of years.
In 1991 he was appointed by the Tirana Pluralist Committee as a teacher and deputy director of "Ismail Qemali" gymnasium. Meanwhile he actively participated in the Democratic Movement and was elected member in the Albanian Parliament for the Democratic Party in two legislatures (1992–1996 and 1996–1997). During this period he also served as chairman of the Parliamentary Media and Culture Committee.

In 2005 he left politics and worked as a freelance journalist, writer and historian. He has written and published a series of books in the field of publicity, historical studies and artistic literature. Butka is married to Merjeme Pasmaçiu, a nephrologist. They have 3 children.

Work

Monographies and historical studies 

 Ringjallje  (1995)
 Kthimi i Mid’hat Frashërit, jeta dhe veprat kryesore ( 1997)
 Mukja-shans i bashkimit, peng i tradhtisë ( 1998)
 Gjeniu i kombit, monografi historike ( 2000)
 Safet Butka, jeta dhe veprat ( 2003)
 Lufta civile në Shqipëri 1943–1945 ( 2006)
 Bombë në Ambasadën Sovjetike  (2008), botimi në anglisht 2014.
 Elita shqiptare ( 2009)
 Masakra e Tivarit (2013)
 Dritëhije të historisë (2012)
 Kryengritjet e para kundërkomuniste (2013)

Artistic literature 
 Vdekja e bardhë, tregime, 2001
 Humbja nuk është mbarim, tregime, 2004
 Në shtëpinë tonë, tregime, 2008
 Miti i Haxhi Qamilit, roman, 2010
 Dora e shtetit, tregime (2010)
 Kristo Kirka, ese (2012), nderuar me çmimin kombëtar "Penda e argjendtë”
 Më në fund të lirë, tregime ( 2013)

Movie screenplays and documentaries 
 Ventotene
 Lëvizja Kryeziu
 Pesë herë i dënuar politik
 Kryengritja e Malësisë së Madhe
 Kryengritja e Postribës
 Dy poetët martirë
 Mallakastra siç ka qenë
 Kryengritja e Dibrës më 1913
 Mid’hat Frashëri
 Martirët.

See also
History of Albania

References

1938 births
Uran
Albanian writers
20th-century Albanian historians
Albanian politicians
Living people
21st-century Albanian historians